Barnes Ridge may refer to:

Barnes Ridge (Antarctica)
Barnes Ridge (Missouri)